Sun Fucheng (November 19, 1927 – April 3, 1983) was a Chinese international football player and coach. As a player, he was one of the first footballers to play for the People's Republic of China at the international level, and as a coach, he was  the very  managers to manage a fully professional Chinese football club, with his stint at Beijing FC.

Football career
Sun Fucheng wa born in Dalian. in 1951, Sun began his football career playing for the Liaoning FC.in 1952, he was  selected  to take part in China. in 1957, Sun take part in China's first ever qualification for the 1958 FIFA World Cup. after 1960, Sun went to Beijing FC as a player and
manager.

Management career
Sun Fucheng was retired in 1963, then he work as management of Beijing FC until 1973.

Death
On April 3, 1983, Sun Fucheng  died of lung cancer in Beijing, age 56.

References

1927 births
1983 deaths
Chinese footballers
China international footballers
Footballers from Dalian
Footballers from Liaoning
Association football forwards